Henry Steel may refer to:

 Henry Steel, fictional pirate in the CBS reality television show Pirate Master
 Henry Robert Steel (born 1989), South African chess player
 Sir Henry Steel, Lord Provost of Edinburgh 1938 to 1940